David Christopher Ormerod CBE,  KC (Hon), DCL(Hon) is a professor of criminal law at University College London. He was appointed a deputy High Court judge in 2018.

Ormerod was appointed Commander of the Order of the British Empire (CBE) in the 2021 New Year Honours for services to criminal justice.

References 

British legal scholars
21st-century English judges
Academics of University College London
Living people
Year of birth missing (living people)
Commanders of the Order of the British Empire